Muniz or Muñiz may refer to:

Places 
 Muñiz, Buenos Aires, a district in San Miguel Partido, in Argentina

People
 Muniz (surname)